The women's parallel giant slalom event in snowboarding at the 2002 Winter Olympics was held in Park City, United States. The competition began on 14 February, with the final rounds on 15 February.

Medalists

Qualification

The top 16 racers, based on their qualification time, advanced to the elimination rounds.

DNF - Did not finish

Elimination round

In the elimination round, each head-to-head contest consists of two runs. If one competitor wins both runs, that competitor advances. If the runs are split, the racer with the overall fastest time advances.

References

Snowboarding at the 2002 Winter Olympics
2002 in snowboarding
2002 in women's sport
Women's events at the 2002 Winter Olympics